Al Sieber (February 27, 1843  – February 19, 1907) was a German-American who fought in the U.S Civil War and in the American Old West against Indians. He became a prospector and later served as a Chief of Scouts during the Apache Wars.

Early life 

Albert "Al" Sieber was born in Mingolsheim, Baden as the 13th of 14 children. He was baptized on March 1, 1843, in St. Lambertus Church, Mingolsheim. His father Johannes died on September 16, 1845.  Between March and April 1851, three years after the "Badian Revolution", his mother Eva Katharina née Fischer, emigrated with her still living eight children (six had already died) to  Lancaster, Pennsylvania. The family moved to Minnesota several years later.

Civil War service 

He enlisted on March 4, 1862, in Company B, 1st Minnesota Volunteer Infantry during the American Civil War. Sieber was severely wounded on July 2, 1863 in the Battle of Gettysburg, at Cemetery Ridge. He fought in several key engagements, including Battle of Antietam, Battle of Fredericksburg, Battle of Chancellorsville, Battle of Gettysburg, Apache Wars, Battle of Cibecue Creek, and Battle of Big Dry Wash. After the war, he became a prospector in California, Nevada, and in Arizona Territory, where he managed a ranch from 1868 to 1871.

Army scout and guide 

In July 1871, General George Stoneman hired Sieber as Chief of Scouts and he served for much of the Apache Wars. He participated in Crook's Tonto (Apache) campaign (1871–73). When the Camp Verde reservation was closed, Sieber was told to move Yavapais and Tonto Apaches to the San Carlos Reservation in the middle of winter. He remained employed there and participated in several engagements with Apache groups that had left the reservation.

On October 24, 1874, the Arizona Miner reported, "Al Zieber, Sergeant Stauffer and a mixed command of white and red soldiers are in the hills of Verde looking for some erring Apaches, whom they will be apt to find." Three days later, Sieber and Sgt. Rudolph Stauffer found the Apaches that had escaped the reservation at Cave Creek and fought them. Josephine Earp wrote that when she arrived in Arizona, she learned that "some renegade Yuma-Apaches had escaped from the reservation to which they had been consigned and had returned to their old haunts on the war-path" and that Sieber was tracking the escaped Apache. She said Sieber and his scouts led her stagecoach and its passengers to a nearby adobe ranch house where they remained until the Indians were captured.

In February, April, and May 1877, Sieber acted as a guide for Pima County Marshal Wiley Standefer, who was pursuing outlaws in the region.

In 1883 Crook went into the Sierra Madre of Mexico following Geronimo. Sieber was Crook's lead civilian scout and mentor to Tom Horn, whom he taught to speak German, as well as fighting together during the Battle of Cibecue Creek and Big Dry Wash. Sieber was in the field but not present when Geronimo surrendered to Lt Charles B. Gatewood and General Nelson Miles in 1886.

Sieber stayed on at San Carlos as Chief of Scouts for another 13 years.

Wounds 

In 1887, Sieber was shot and wounded when the Apache Kid and his followers escaped the reservation to prevent being jailed again.  During his various battles and fights over the course of his life, Sieber received 28 wounds.

Perjury and revenge on the Apache Kid 
A few days after the Apache Kid surrendered, he was found guilty of mutiny and desertion and sentenced to ten years at the military prison on Alcatraz Island. Secretary of War William Endicott reviewed the court-martial file of the Apache Kid and came to the conclusion that the trial had not been fair. On October 20, 1888, six months after his arrival on Alcatraz, the Apache Kid was released and headed back to San Carlos, Arizona. Unhappy with military law, Sieber decided to retry the Kid, this time for attempted murder in territorial court. On October 29, 1889, as the star witness, Sieber testified that the Apache Kid had shot him, even though he knew the Kid was not wearing a weapon at that moment. Witnesses saw Curley, another Apache scout, shoot at Sieber, but none were called to testify. Al Sieber's perjury resulted in a sentence of seven years in the Yuma Territorial Prison for the Apache Kid and 3 other scouts.

Post army life and death 
Sieber was fired from his San Carlos Chief of Scouts position in December 1890 by Major John L. Bullis. He left San Carlos and took up prospecting until 1898.

On February 19, 1907, Sieber was leading an Apache work crew that was building the Tonto road to the new Roosevelt Dam site on the confluence of the Salt River and Tonto Creek on the border of Gila County and Maricopa County in Gila County. The project was under the supervision of another famous frontier scout, "Yellowstone" Luther Kelly at Apache Trail, a separate downstream road, Maricopa County, Arizona. Sieber was killed when a boulder rolled on him during construction.   He was buried with military honors at the cemetery in Globe, Arizona.

In film and media 

Sieber has been portrayed in a number of films:
 1953: The character "Ed Bannon" portrayed by Charlton Heston in the film Arrowhead was based on Sieber-
 1954: John McIntire in the film Apache
 1955: Kenneth MacDonald in the episode "Apache Kid" from the television series Stories of the Century
 1967: Willard Sage (as "Al Seiber") in the film Silver Tombstone, and Strother Martin as Ed Schieffelin
 1979: Richard Widmark in the miniseries Mr. Horn
 1993: Robert Duvall in the film Geronimo: An American Legend

Notes

Footnotes

References 

 Bourke, John G. On the Border with Crook. University of Nebraska Press. Lincoln. 1891. .
 (reprint): Bison Books. 1971. .
 Crook, George. General George Crook: His Autobiography. University of Oklahoma Press. 1986. .
 Cruse, Thomas. Apache Days and After. University of Oklahoma Press. 1987. .
 Cozzens, Peter. Eyewitnesses to the Indian Wars, 1865–1890 (The Struggle for Apacheria). Stackpole Books. 2001. .
 Davis, Britton. The Truth About Geronimo. Bison Books. 1976. .
 Debo, Angie. Geronimo: The Man, His Time, His Place. University of Oklahoma Press. 1982. .
 Field, Ron. US Army Frontier Scouts 1840–1921. Osprey Publishing. 2003. .
 Gatewood, Charles B. Lt. Charles Gatewood & His Apache Wars Memoir. Bison Books. 2009. .
 Goff, John S. Arizona Biographical Dictionary. Black Mountain Press. Cave Creek. 1983.
 Hutton, Paul Andrew. The Apache Wars: The hunt for Geronimo, the Apache Kid, and the captive boy who started the longest war in American history. Broadway Books. New York. 2016. .
 Lockwood, Frank C. More Arizona Characters. University of Arizona. 1943.
 Roberts, David. Once They Moved Like The Wind; (Cochise, Geronimo, And The Apache Wars). Touchstone. 2005. .
 Robinson, Charles M. General Crook and the Western Frontier. University of Oklahoma Press. 2001. .
 Sabin, Edwin L. General Crook and the Fighting Apaches (1871–1886). Lulu Press. 2008. .
 Thrapp, Dan L.  Al Sieber: Chief of Scouts. University of Oklahoma Press. Norman. 1964. .
 Thrapp, Dan L. The Conquest of Apacheria. University of Oklahoma Press. Norman. 1967. .
 Thrapp, Dan L. Encyclopedia of Frontier Biography. Volume III, P–Z. University of Oklahoma Press. (Reprint 1991). .
 Traywick,  Ben T. Legendary Characters of Southeast Arizona. Red Marie's. Tombstone. 1992.

External links 

 
 

1843 births
1907 deaths
People from Karlsruhe (district)
American people of the Indian Wars
American people of German descent
German-American Forty-Eighters
Union Army soldiers
People of Minnesota in the American Civil War
Apache Wars
United States Army Indian Scouts
Arizona pioneers